There are over 30 lakes named Mud Lake within the U.S. state of Washington.

 Green Lake, also known as Mud Lake, Adams County, Washington.	
 Mud Lake, Clallam County, Washington.	
 Cat Lake, also known as Mud Lake, Clallam County, Washington.	
 Mud Lake, also known as Lake Rosannah, Clark County, Washington.		
 Mud Lake, Ferry County, Washington.		
 Mud Lake, Ferry County, Washington.		
 Mud Lake, Jefferson County, Washington.	
 Mud Lake, King County, Washington.		
 Mud Lake, King County, Washington.		
 Shady Lake, also known as Mud Lake, King County, Washington.	
 Mud Lake, King County, Washington.		
 Totem Lake, also known as Mud Lake, King County, Washington.	
 Mud Lake, Lewis County, Washington.		
 Mud Lake, Okanogan County, Washington.	
 Mud Lake, Okanogan County, Washington.	
 Mud Lake, Okanogan County, Washington.	
 Mud Lake, Okanogan County, Washington.	
 Mud Lake, Pierce County, Washington.	
 Waughop Lake, also known as Mud Lake, Pierce County, Washington.	
 Mud Lake, Skagit County, Washington.	
 Mud Lake, Skagit County, Washington.	
 Grouse Lake, also known as Mud Lake, Snohomish County, Washington.	
 Lake Serene, also known as Mud Lake, Snohomish County, Washington.	
 Beverly Lake, also known as Mud Lake, Snohomish County, Washington.	
 Mud Lake, Snohomish County, Washington.	
 Mud Lake, Snohomish County, Washington.	
 Mud Lake, Spokane County, Washington.	
 Mud Lake, Stevens County, Washington.	
 Mud Lake (Thurston County, Washington)
 Mud Lake, Whatcom County, Washington.	
 Mud Lake, Whatcom County, Washington.	
 Mud Lake, Whitman County, Washington.	
 Mud Lake, Yakima County, Washington.	
 Mud Lake, Yakima County, Washington.	
 Little Mud Lake, also known as Mud Lake, Yakima County, Washington.

References
 USGS-U.S. Board on Geographic Names

Lakes of Washington (state)